The Funj are an ethnic group in present-day Sudan. The Funj set up the Funj Sultanate with Abdallah Jamma and ruled the area for several centuries. The Funj rose in southern Nubia and had overthrown the remnants of the old Christian kingdom of Alodia. In 1504 a Funj leader named Amara Dunqas, founded the Black Sultanate at Sannar (the capital). The Black Sultanate soon became the keystone of the Funj Empire.

The origins of the Funj are not clearly known. However, there are three different hypotheses regarding their origin. The Funj claimed to be descendants of Banu Umayya through those who escaped the slaughter of their family by the Abbasids and fled to Abyssinia and thence into the Nubian territory. Since the Ja'alin claimed descent from the Abbasids and the Abdallab from the Juhayna, the Funj may have claimed Umayyad descent to express their superiority to their subject peoples.

James Bruce, in his book Travels to Discover the Source of the Nile, theorized that the Funj descend from the Shilluk people. Bruce wrote his book after 22 years of travel through North Africa and Ethiopia. The third hypothesis is that they are descendants of the remnants of the Kingdom of Alodia Nubians who escaped further south to replenish their supplies and resources and returned to establish their state. The most cited source is that they are Nubians who mixed with Arabs.

Notable people 

 Nasra bint ʿAdlan, noblewoman and power broker

Notes

References

External links

Ethnic groups in Sudan
Muslim communities in Africa
Nubia